Crematoxenini is a tribe of rove beetles in the family Staphylinidae. There are eleven genera and about eighteen described species in Crematoxenini.

Genera
These eleven genera belong to the tribe Crematoxenini:
 Beyeria Fenyes, 1910 i c g b
 Crematoxenus Mann, 1921
 Cryptomimus Reichensperger, 1926
 Diploeciton Wasmann, 1923
 Ecitosius Seevers, 1965
 Ecitotima Seevers, 1965
 Neivaphilus Jacobson & Kistner, 1992
 Neobeyeria Jacobson, Kistner & Abdel-Galil, 1987 i c g b
 Philacamatus Bruch, 1933
 Probeyeria Seevers, 1965 i c g
 Pulicomorpha Mann, 1924 i c g
Data sources: i = ITIS, c = Catalogue of Life, g = GBIF, b = Bugguide.net

References

Further reading

 
 
 
 
 

Aleocharinae
Articles created by Qbugbot